The 2023 Toyota Owners 400 is an upcoming NASCAR Cup Series race that will be held on April 2, 2023, at Richmond Raceway in Richmond, Virginia. It is contested over 400 laps on the 0.75 mile (1.2 km) asphalt short track, it will be the seventh race of the 2023 NASCAR Cup Series season.

Report

Background

Richmond Raceway (RR) is a 0.75 miles (1.21 km), D-shaped, asphalt race track located just outside Richmond, Virginia in unincorporated Henrico County. It hosts the NASCAR Cup Series, NASCAR Xfinity Series and the NASCAR Camping World Truck Series. Known as "America's premier short track", it has formerly hosted events such as the International Race of Champions, Denny Hamlin Short Track Showdown, and the USAC sprint car series. Due to Richmond Raceway's unique "D" shape which allows drivers to reach high speeds, Richmond has long been known as a short track that races like a superspeedway. With its multiple racing grooves, and proclivity for contact Richmond is a favorite among NASCAR drivers and fans.

Entry list
 (R) denotes rookie driver.
 (i) denotes driver who is ineligible for series driver points.

Media

Television
Fox Sports will cover their 22nd race at the Richmond Raceway. Mike Joy, two-time Richmond winner Clint Bowyer, and TBA will call the race from the broadcast booth. Jamie Little and Regan Smith will handle pit road for the television side, and Larry McReynolds will provide insight from the Fox Sports studio in Charlotte.

Radio
MRN will have the radio call for the race which will also be simulcasted on Sirius XM NASCAR Radio. Alex Hayden, Jeff Striegle and former crew chief Todd Gordon will call the race in the booth when the field raced down the frontstretch. Mike Bagley will call the race from a platform inside the backstretch when the field raced down the backstretch. Steve Post Kim Coon and Brienne Pedigo will handle pit road for the radio side.

References

Toyota Owners 400
Toyota Owners 400
Toyota Owners 400
NASCAR races at Richmond Raceway